"Throw Grampa From the Dane" is the twentieth and penultimate episode of the twenty-ninth season of the American animated television series The Simpsons, and the 638th episode of the series overall. It aired in the United States on Fox on May 13, 2018. The title is a takeoff of the film  Throw Momma from the Train.

Plot
The Simpsons wake up to find their house completely flooded with water. It is revealed that the night before, Marge asked Homer to help her readjust the position of their sailboat painting. However, they accidentally knocked a nail through one of the water pipes, causing the flood. After the Simpsons receive an insurance payout of $102 and six months' temporary housing while the water damage in their house is being repaired, Grampa asks to use the money to fund an important operation, one he wishes not to discuss. After Dr. Nick proves ineffective for this, Lisa brings up Denmark's free healthcare, and Marge suggests that they use the insurance payout and Homer's vacation time to take a family trip to Denmark for Grampa's operation. Homer at first refuses, but Grampa coerces him into agreeing to go.

Upon arriving in a wind-powered district of Denmark, the family stay at an Airbnb apartment that is space-efficient, to Lisa's glee. The owner proceeds to show them around Copenhagen, visiting places like Amalienborg, Land of Legends and Louisiana Museum of Modern Art. Marge and Lisa are fascinated by their culture, while Bart and Homer make fun of it. Homer learns that although non-Danish people do not necessarily qualify for free healthcare, people who are injured in Denmark are treated for free, while Bart, Lisa and Marge begin to contemplate the idea of moving to Denmark for at least one semester, to which Homer disagrees. The three then storm off, leaving Homer and Grampa scouring through Denmark to try to get Grampa injured, without any success.

At Kronborg Castle, having become accustomed to Danish culture, Marge asks for Homer to think about moving to Denmark. As he finally begins to consider the possibility, he changes his mind at the last minute and tries to push Grampa down the stairs for his free operation. However, as Grampa clings to Homer's leg, he admits he did not really need an operation for something life-threatening, but to remove a heart-shaped tattoo engraved to Mona, as he feels ashamed of living without her. As Homer and Grampa drown their sorrows from Mona's death at a Danish bar, a Danish woman approaches Homer and they proceed to share a dance together. A devastated Marge sees them through the window and runs off, with Homer following her.

Following this, an understanding but angry Marge refuses to come home with Homer, wishing to stay in Denmark with the kids indefinitely. At the airport, Homer begins to regret leaving her in Denmark, but Grampa admits he ruined his marriage to Mona similarly with his stubbornness, advising him not to make the same mistakes he did. The two race back to the apartment where Homer pledges his love for her and vows to stay in Copenhagen with her. However, Marge admits that she is having second thoughts due to problems with space and arrangement in the apartment, and concedes to Homer that she is ready to go home. Homer and Bart agree to go back as well, with only Lisa wanting to stay in Denmark. Before leaving, the family take Grampa to a socialized tattoo parlour, where the tattoo artist refashions his Mona tattoo for free into a lemonade tattoo, giving him a new outlook in life.

Reception
Dennis Perkins of The A.V. Club gave this episode a C+, stating, "Grampa needs some expensive medical treatment, so the family heads off to a foreign country whose very different economic system allows for inexpensive health care for all. Yes, the Simpsons are heading to Cuba! No, wait, that was last season. Okay, well, once there, the family finds that their new surroundings offer a wealth of cultural benefits that seem almost designed to fulfill needs and dreams each member (but one) didn't even realize they had. Yes, the Simpsons are shipping up to Boston! Dammit, nope—that was season 28 as well. Man, it's almost like the series is out of ideas, completely."

"Throw Grampa from the Dane" scored a 0.9 rating with a 4 share and was watched by 2.14 million people, making The Simpsons the second most watched show on Fox that night.

References

External links
 

2018 American television episodes
The Simpsons (season 29) episodes
Television episodes set in Denmark
Copenhagen in fiction